Akhtachi-ye Sharqi Rural District  is in Simmineh District of Bukan County, West Azerbaijan province, Iran. At the National Census of 2006, its population was 9,571 in 1,739 households. There were 9,916 inhabitants in 2,358 households at the following census of 2011. At the most recent census of 2016, the population of the rural district was 11,877 in 3,514 households. The largest of its 23 villages was Nachit, with 2,850 people.

References 

Bukan County

Rural Districts of West Azerbaijan Province

Populated places in West Azerbaijan Province

Populated places in Bukan County